The Mountain Pacific Sports Federation (MPSF) men's soccer tournament was the conference championship tournament in men's college soccer for the Mountain Pacific Sports Federation. The tournament was held annually between 2009 and 2012. The conference was disbanded when MPSF membership ended in favor of teams joining the Western Athletic Conference.

History 
The MPSF was founded in 1992 and specifically created to provide an outlet for competition in non-revenue-producing Olympic sports, particularly for institutions in the Western United States. At the time of the foundation, several prominent western conference, such as the Western Athletic Conference and the Pac-12 Conference did not sponsor men's soccer as an NCAA varsity sport. This allowed the MPSF to provide conference competition to Western teams to ease travel, provide a competitive environment, as well as provide an outlet for a direct berth into the NCAA Division I Men's Soccer Championship.

For the first 20 years of the program's existence, the regular season winner was also crowned the MPSF champion. It was not until 2009 that a tournament itself was established culminating the regular season. Membership throughout the years changed when the Pac-12 began sponsoring men's soccer in 2000. When the WAC began sponsoring men's soccer in 2013, the MPSF dwindled to three members, suspending the conference's sponsorship of the sport.

Winners 

The following is a list of MPSF Tournament winners:

Key

Finals

Regular season winners 
From 1992 until 2008, the MPSF champion was crowned to the team with the best regular season record.

References

External links 
 MPSF Men's Soccer Champions
 MPSF Men's Soccer Archive